New Britain is a hymn tune which was first published under other names in the early 19th century, including St Mary's, Gallaher, Symphony, Harmony Grove and Solon.  In 1835, it was paired with the lyrics of John Newton's hymn, Amazing Grace, in William Walker's The Southern Harmony, and Musical Companion.  This sold over 600,000 copies in multiple editions.  Walker named the tune "New Britain" in that work and the combination was reprinted in The Sacred Harp (1844) which was even more influential.  The name "Amazing Grace" was first used for the combination in Sankey's Gospel Hymns 2 (1877).

The tune is pentatonic and in Ionian mode.

References 

Hymn tunes